The Scottish Men's Curling Championship is the national men's curling championship for Scotland. The championship usually decides which team of curlers is sent to the World Men's Curling Championship, but in Olympic years the winner must play the British Olympic representative to play to determine the Scottish team at the Worlds. Beginning in 2021, Scotland's World Championship teams will be selected by Scottish Curling instead.

Past champions

See also
Scottish Women's Curling Championship
Scottish Mixed Curling Championship
Scottish Mixed Doubles Curling Championship
Scottish Junior Curling Championships
Scottish Senior Curling Championships
Scottish Schools Curling Championship
Scottish Wheelchair Curling Championship

References

External links
List of champions

Curling competitions in Scotland
1963 establishments in Scotland
Recurring sporting events established in 1963
Annual sporting events in the United Kingdom
Annual events in Scotland
National curling championships